Chadi Jawani Budhe Nu is a Punjabi movie released in 1976 in India.

Synopsis
A small-time businessman (B.S. Sood) reaches the "naughty forties". Now his wife is not good enough anymore, so he decides he needs a modern up to date mistress, resulting in hilarious situations.

Cast
B.S. Sood
Kimti Anand
Rajendranath
Vasundhara
Katy Mirza

Home media 
The film was available on Netflix until August of 2022.

References 

1976 films
Punjabi-language Indian films
1970s Punjabi-language films